John Jesurun is a writer, director and multi-media artist, based in New York City.  His work Chang in a Void Moon is a live serial running since 1983, originally at the Pyramid Club in the East Village and now less frequently at venues worldwide.  He was born 1951 in Battle Creek, Michigan.

Education 

Jesurun received his B.F.A. from the Philadelphia College of Art in 1972 and his M.F.A. in Sculpture from Yale University in 1974.

Career 

From 1976 to 1979 Jesurun was a television content analyst for CBS.  From 1979 to 1982 he was assistant producer of the Dick Cavett Show.  In 1982 he began his theatrical career at the Pyramid Club with his serial play Chang in a Void Moon.  Since 1984 he has written, directed and designed over 25 pieces.

Works

Style 

Jesurun's presentations integrate elements of language, film, architectural space and media. His exploded narratives cover a wide range of themes and explore the relation of form to content, challenging the experience of verbal, visual and intangible perceptions. His work features integrated creation of the text, direction, set and media design. Describing his process, Jesurun explains, "Usually everything happens at the same time. I write with a typewriter on one side and a sketchbook on the other side. So then the words and images and ideas happen simultaneously."

Touring 

Jesurun's company has toured extensively in Europe and the United States. His work has been produced and presented by numerous venues including La Mama, The Kitchen, Dance Theater Workshop, the Walker Arts Center, On the Boards, Brooklyn Academy of Music, the Wexner Center, Kampnagel Theater, Prater Theater, National Theatre of Mexico, Mickery Theater, Theater am Turm, Granada Festival, Eurokaz Zagreb, Bogota International Festival, Vienna Festival, Kyoto Performing Arts Center and Spoleto USA.  His short films have been shown at festivals and alternative spaces in Europe and the US.

Teaching 

Jesurun has taught theater at Goethe University, Frankfurt; Justus Liebig University, Giessen; DasArts, Amsterdam; New York University; La Mama, Umbria; Tokyo University; Kyoto University of Art and Design; and The New School.

References

External links 
 Article by John Jesurun
 BOMB Magazine interview with John Jesurun by Craig Gholson (Winter, 1985)

American theatre directors
Asian Cultural Council grantees
MacArthur Fellows
Living people
University of the Arts (Philadelphia) alumni
Year of birth missing (living people)